Fabretti is an Italian surname. Notable people with the surname include:

Ariodante Fabretti (1816–1894), Italian archaeologist
Raffaello Fabretti (1618–1700), Italian antiquarian
Lucrezia Fabretti (2001–), Italian lifesaver
Quirina Alippi-Fabretti (1849–1919), Italian painter

Surnames of Italian origin